Timur Seyfettin Ölmez (born 10 August 1971) better known as Tim Seyfi, is a Turkish-German actor. In 2017 he played his first leading role as Commissioner Pascha in a TV series of the same name.

Filmography

Film

Television

Awards
In the 2001 International Film Festival (in Badalona) Seyfi won the Best actor award for the short 1999 film The Cookie Thief.

References

External links

Official website

1971 births
Living people
People from Yıldızeli
German people of Turkish descent
German male film actors
German male television actors
Turkish male film actors
Turkish male television actors